The NBA G League's first overall pick is the player who is selected first among all eligible draftees by a team during the annual NBA G League Draft (known as the NBA Development League Draft until 2017). For players to become eligible for the draft they must sign a general contract with the league. They must also be at least 18 years old, not attending college during the season which the draft precedes, and have either graduated from high school or, if the player did not finish high school, had what would have been his graduating class graduate.

No first overall picks have ever won the G League Most Valuable Player Award. Five players have been named to at least one NBA Development League All-Star Game: Andre Barrett, Eddie Gill, Chris Richard, Carlos Powell (twice) and Nick Fazekas. The first All-Star Game did not occur until the 2006–07 season, however, and so the possibility for players such as Mikki Moore to earn an All-Star selection was not possible. Moore was named the NBDL Defensive Player of the Year and was named to the All-NBDL First Team as a rookie in 2002–03. Fazekas, the first overall selection in 2010, and Powell, the first overall selection in 2009, each had previous NBA Development League experience prior to those respective drafts. In 2007–08, Fazekas had played for the Tulsa 66ers while Powell had played for the Dakota Wizards, and both were selected as NBA Development League All-Stars that season, making them back-to-back number one draft picks who had previously been NBADL All-Stars.

Note that from the 2001 through 2004 drafts, it was known as the NBDL Draft. From 2005 through 2016, it was known as the NBA Development League Draft in accordance with the league's slight name change. The 2017 draft was the first under the league's current identity as the NBA G League, following a sponsorship deal with Gatorade.

Key

List of first overall picks

See also
 List of first overall NBA draft picks
 List of first overall WNBA draft picks

Notes

 All statistics are taken from the players' respective draft seasons.
 Indicates the college team, semi-professional and/or professional basketball team that the player most recently competed for heading into his respective draft.
 Robert Covington signed with the Philadelphia 76ers prior to playing in a D-League game in 2014–15. He spent the entire season with the 76ers and did not accumulate any D-League statistics.

References

External links
Number One Picks In The NBA D-League Draft at NBA.com
List of current NBA Development League players

First Overall Draft Pick
National Basketball Association lists